The Ingvar expedition (Swedish: Ingvarståget) is the Swedish Viking Age event that is mentioned on the most of the preserved runestones. About twenty-six Ingvar runestones in Sweden refer to Swedish Viking warriors who travelled east with Ingvar on his expedition to Serkland, or the Saracen lands. The expedition started in the second half of the 1030s and ended catastrophically in the year 1041, according to several Icelandic Annals, and was later the object for an Icelandic saga in the 12th century; the Yngvars saga víðförla. The Ingvar expedition seems to have been organized mainly on the basis of today's Svealand.  King at the time was Anund Jakob. 
One of the most famous of the Ingvar runestones is the Gripsholm Runestone (Sö 179). Its inscription tells that it was raised in honour of Ingvar’s brother Haraldr who had died in Serkland.

Its runic inscription reads as follows:

Latin transliteration:

 × tula : lit : raisa : stain : þinsa| |at : sun : sin : haralt : bruþur : inkuars : þaiʀ furu : trikila : fiari : at : kuli : auk : a:ustarla| |ar:ni : kafu : tuu : sunar:la : a sirk:lan:ti

Runic Swedish transcription:

 Tōla lēt ræisa stæin þennsa at sun sinn Harald, brōður Ingvars.
 Þæiʀ fōru drængila
 fiarri at gulli
 ok austarla
 ærni gāfu,
 dōu sunnarla
 ą̄ Særklandi.

English translation:

 "Tóla had this stone raised in memory of her son Haraldr, Ingvar's brother. They travelled manfully far for gold, and in the east gave (food) to the eagle. (They) died in the south in Serkland."

References

Further reading
 Fischer, Svante (1999). Ingvarsstenarna i tid och rum. Uppsala University. 
 Pritsak, Omeljan. (1981). The Origin of Rus. Cambridge, Mass.: Distributed by Harvard University Press for the Harvard Ukrainian Research Institute. 
 Tunstall, Peter (2005). The Saga of Yngvar the Traveller.

External links
 Svante Fischer (1999). Ingvarsstenarna i tid och rum

Viking warriors
Varangians
11th-century Swedish people
History of the Caspian Sea

 
Scandinavian history